WEVD was an American brokered programming radio station with some news-talk launched in August 1927 by the Socialist Party of America. Making use of the initials of recently deceased party leader Eugene Victor Debs in its call sign, the station operated from Woodhaven in the New York City borough of Queens. The station was purchased with a $250,000 radio fund raised by the Socialist Party in its largest fundraising effort of the 1920s and was intended to spread progressive ideas to a mass audience. A number of national trade unions and other institutions aided the Socialists in obtaining the station.

Originally broadcasting at 1220 kHz AM, later on 1300 kHz, for many years on 1330 kHz and finally on 1050 kHz, operation of the station was acquired by the publishing association responsible for producing the Yiddish-language social democratic daily newspaper The Jewish Daily Forward in 1932. An FM station using the same call sign was added during the 1950s. After briefly leaving AM broadcasting in 1979, The Forward swapped its FM frequency for another AM frequency and continued broadcasting as a small ethnic station until divesting itself late in the 1980s.

History

Origins

Radio broadcasting emerged on a mass scale in the United States during the first half of the 1920s, with the number of stations in operation rising from 28 in 1921 to 571 in 1925. A new form of mass media had emerged. Congress passed federal legislation called the Radio Act of 1927 early in that year establishing a Federal Radio Commission (FRC), which was granted power to regulate the emerging industry, granting licenses and assigning broadcasting wavelengths to bring order to a chaotic market.

Under this legislation, broadcasters would not own the right to broadcast at a certain frequency but would rather use what was deemed a public resource for a limited period of time, not to exceed three years. To earn continuation of the privilege of broadcasting over the public airwaves, stations would be forced to demonstrate service to the public interest under the new law.

The Socialist Party of America was in the throes of a membership decline throughout the decade of the 1920s, the communist left wing of the organization having been suspended, expelled or split from the organization beginning with the seminal 1919 Emergency National Convention of the party. Dues-paying membership fell during this period from more than 100,000 to less than 10,000. The party's finances were similarly deeply affected and the organization felt pressed to explore new means of reaching an increasingly apathetic public. At its December 1926 quarterly meeting the governing National Executive Committee of the Socialist Party decided to erect a radio broadcasting station as a memorial to its recently deceased co-founder, Eugene V. Debs, who had died in October of the previous year.

In March 1927 the Socialist Party of America launched a fundraising drive aimed at generating $250,000 for the purchase of an AM radio station. Party leader and head of the League for Industrial Democracy Norman Thomas was chosen as chairman of the Board of Trustees for the new enterprise and venerated party founder Morris Hillquit was appointed as treasurer.

A total of 21 others from the liberal, labor and socialist community were appointed as a Board of Trustees including such publicly recognized figures as pacifist minister - John Haynes Holmes, Brotherhood of Sleeping Car Porters founder A. Philip Randolph, Amalgamated Clothing Workers leader Sidney Hillman, novelist Upton Sinclair and American Civil Liberties Union head Roger Baldwin. G. August Gerber, son of New York Socialist Party functionary Julius Gerber, was named as secretary of the Board and director of the fundraising drive.

At the time of the fundraising drive's launch Norman Thomas remarked:

The usefulness of a well established radio station open to full and frank discussion of great economic and social issues is beyond doubt. Past experience combines with common sense in assuring us that the commercial broadcasting stations cannot be expected to give much time or attention to the great vision for which Gene Debs gave his life. I am glad to observe that you have invited and obtained the acceptance of men and women as trustees who are not members of the Socialist Party. Such ... [shall] guarantee that the Debs Memorial Radio Fund will be free from a narrow and intolerant partisanship.

Thomas and Hillquit were explicit in their desire to make the radio station a memorial to the departed Debs. In a joint statement they called for a "monument" which was to be "a living instrument of social service ... to be operated in the interests of all progressive movements and ideas and in aid of all struggles for social justice in the tolerant and broad-minded spirit of Gene Debs."

The Debs Memorial Radio Fund launched its fundraising campaign with a mailing of 15,000 letters soliciting funds for the establishment of a Socialist Party-owned radio station. This first round of solicitation brought in just over $2650 — barely more than 1% of the declared goal $250,000 sought for the project. The Radio Fund's trustees estimated cost of launching a station at $100,000 and hoped to invest the balance to generate sufficient interest income to allow for perpetual operations. While this grand vision of substantial funding proved overly optimistic, the necessary funds for the acquisition of a station were successfully raised from party members and sympathetic labor unions during the first half of 1927.

Launch
Around the first of August 1927 the trustees of the "Debs Memorial Radio Fund" announced the purchase of AM radio station WSOM, transmitting from Woodhaven in the New York City borough of Queens. WSOM had been on the air since 1926, broadcasting initially at 1040 and 1220 kHz; the station had moved into New York just six months prior. Immediate application was to be made to the Federal Radio Commission for a change of call letters to WDEBS, it was reported, as well as for an increase of transmission power from 500 to 1,000 watts to enable the station to broadcast with less interference from the skyscrapers of New York. The broadcast studio was to be located somewhere in Manhattan, it was reported.

The Socialist Party and its partners had entered into the acquisition of the existing station, formerly owned by Union Course Laboratories of Woodhaven, after having received assurances from the Federal Radio Commission that a broadcasting license would be promptly granted upon purchase. Joining the Socialist Party with the Debs radio project were a number of national and international trade unions, including the United Mine Workers of America, the International Ladies' Garment Workers' Union, the Amalgamated Clothing Workers of America, the Brotherhood of Locomotive Engineers, the Brotherhood of Sleeping Car Porters, and the United Hebrew Trades. Also joining the fundraising effort were the left wing fraternal benefit society the Workmen's Circle and the financially successful Yiddish language social democratic daily, The Jewish Daily Forward, headed by Abraham Cahan.

While the purchase price of the station was not revealed in the press, August Gerber indicated that the bulk of the $250,000 operating fund — which had still not been fully met — was to be used to cover ongoing operating expenses. Gerber expressed a belief that the station would become self-supporting in fairly short order and indicated a desire to make the new New York station the flagship of a network of "labor radio stations" throughout the United States.

At the time of the station's purchase, Gerber declared:

The party's plan for the use of call letters WDEBS was short-circuited by the FRC, which ruled that only aircraft could use five-letter call names and that ground radio station was limited to four letters or fewer. Eugene V. Debs' initials were thus substituted, and WEVD was born.

The Debs Memorial Radio Fund began operating WEVD on August 18, 1927. Broadcasting was not limited to the English language, however. One of the organizations behind the funding of the WEVD project, the widely circulated and financially successful Jewish Daily Forward, launched what would become what one radio historian has called "the most famous Yiddish radio program of all time" — The Forward Hour. The show was first broadcast every Sunday morning at 11 am and gained a significant following among the Yiddish-speaking immigrant community of New York City.

Finances were tight throughout the entire period of the Socialist Party's operation of the station. Operating costs were minimized through the generosity of the ILGWU, which allowed the station free use of the entire 6th floor of its headquarters building in New York City. A network of studios and reception rooms were created in the space, providing a fully adequate base of operations for the station.

Operating funding came from small-scale listener contributions, regular donations from the American Civil Liberties Union and other organizations interested in the station's mission, and the left wing philanthropic trust, the American Fund for Public Service, commonly known as the Garland Fund. Station manager August Gerber dedicated much of his time to keeping the station's meager revenue stream flowing, although already by January 1928 Norman Thomas was opining that the Socialist Party and its radio station "can't go on living like this."

Regulatory difficulties
On top of the Socialist Party's financial troubles came regulatory problems with the FRC, which on May 25, 1928 demanded that WEVD and 163 other stations show cause why their broadcasting licenses should not be revoked as part of a plan to rationalize the distribution of radio bandwidth by forcing out small stations catering to niche audiences in favor of fewer high powered stations broadcasting commercially to a mass market.

Representatives of WEVD and 109 other threatened stations made their way to Washington, D.C. in July 1928 for two weeks of regulatory hearings on the issue. Station manager Gerber responded with a statement emphasizing the importance of defending free speech and the right of political minorities to submit their ideas to a broad public. Party leader Norman Thomas echoed this perspective, declaring the value of WEVD and other community stations as a bulwark against a "big chain system" which tended to "standardize — to make robots and Babbitts of the American people."

The efforts of Gerber and Thomas ultimately proved successful, with the FRC approving the WEVD renewal application one month later. In the FRC's judgment WEVD had followed a "very satisfactory policy" of representing a range of political and economic perspectives befitting "the mouthpiece of a substantial political or religious minority." An editor at the New York Times concurred with the radio regulators' assessment, noting that revoking WEVD's license on the basis of its political views "would be both unjust and stupid."

WEVD won praise for its news reporting and commentary, taking an array of issues relating to world affairs, American foreign policy, and activities of the American labor movement. In an era in which few stations did likewise, WEVD produced programming dealing with African-American history and culture, including the broadcast of a weekly Pullman Porters Hour sponsored by the Brotherhood of Sleeping Car Porters, which included both entertainment and talks on serious topics of interest to the black community of New York City.

WEVD's Educational Director, Paul Blanshard, expanded the station's educational content following its August 1928 license renewal, including weekly courses on economics conducted by A.J. Muste of Brookwood Labor College. Sunday afternoons the station broadcast a regular speakers' forum which included such prominent liberal voices as journalist Walter Lippman, Rabbi Stephen S. Wise, and Oswald Garrison Villard, publisher of The Nation magazine.

Frequency change and more trouble

Late in 1928, by General Order 40, WEVD was moved to a new frequency by the Federal Radio Commission, 1300 AM, and was able to boost its power somewhat. While the move had been sought by the Debs Memorial Radio Fund, which remained the legal entity owning the station, the change ultimately solved little — WEVD remained underpowered and forced to share its frequency with three other stations. The station broadcast 50 hours per week, ranging from as little as two hours on Fridays to 18 hours on Wednesdays.

WEVD found itself in a difficult financial position that was a veritable catch-22 — unions and other left wing institutions were difficult to motivate to make donations due to the station's limited broadcast time and poor signal coverage, but without these donations it would be impossible to improve the transmission situation which would make the donations happen. To make up the financial shortfall the station became aggressive in pushing for contributions from its listeners.

The FRC continued to seek a reduction in the number of stations to more closely match the limited number of broadcast frequencies and saw weak and underfinanced stations such as WEVD as fodder for the executioner's axe. A number of complaints about the station began to be accumulated. In October 1930 a new set of hearings began with respect to the license renewal of the socialist radio station. A range of violations of the Radio Act of 1927 were cited, including repeated failure to announce station call letters on the air every 15 minutes and inability to stay on its assigned wavelength. A recommendation was made by the FRC examiner assigned to the case to deny the station's license renewal application.

Once again Norman Thomas, August Gerber, and Morris Hillquit jumped to action, painting the station's woes as part of a political vendetta aimed at homogenization of the radio airwaves at the expense of political minorities. The American Civil Liberties Union promised its aid in making the WEVD renewal controversy a national free speech campaign. The final report of the FRC examiner was filed on December 11, 1930 and the station was notified of the decision a week later. Within two weeks the station had submitted a 17-page challenge of the FRC examiner's ruling, which combined with public pressure from listeners compelled the FRC to temporarily reverse its decision on January 13, 1931.

Additional regulatory hearings about WEVD were held in March and May 1931, with regulators charging that the Debs Memorial Radio Fund lacked sufficient financial resources to meet minimum standards established by the FRC. The uniqueness of WEVD's broadcast content was also denied. Regulators thus sought to award the WEVD frequency to station WFOX, owned by Paramount Pictures, arguing that station's "superior fitness to serve the public convenience, necessity and welfare."

In response to the FRC's hostile action, efforts were made to address the situation at WEVD through a fundamental reorganization of the operation. Problems to be addressed included inadequate equipment, poor broadcast location, insufficient funding, and a haphazard planning of station content. Party leader Morris Hillquit was particularly instrumental in the reorganization, coming up with the idea of selling $50,000 in WEVD stock in order to pay off standing obligations and invest in new capacity and content.

The need to raise funds to improve and expand operations during the second half of 1931 was answered by Abe Cahan, editor and publisher of the social democratic Jewish Daily Forward, the largest Yiddish-language newspaper in the world. Cahan was firmly committed to the importance of the project and he made the newspapers funds freely available, depositing $70,000 on account in the fall of 1931 for the expansion of the station assuming the renewal of its broadcast license. Together with previous and subsequent cash infusions, the Forward had invested $200,000 in WEVD by the end of that year.

In a split decision the FRC renewed the license for WEVD at the end of October 1931. Preparations immediately began for the transfer of the station's operations from the 6th floor of the ILGWU building in Manhattan to a new home located on Long Island, and the station's management was shuffled. The grand opening of the new studio took place on September 28, 1932, and was marked by an array of liberal and socialist worthies who spoke at the occasion, including Hillquit, Cahan, educator John Dewey, magazine publisher Oswald Garrison Villard, and writer Heywood Broun.

Transfer to The Forward

In 1938, WEVD bought one of its time-sharing partners on 1330, WHAP/WFAB; an FCC examiner recommended the Debs Memorial Fund be allowed to buy the WFAB assets for $85,000 from the Fifth Avenue Broadcasting Corporation, expanding its weekly broadcast hours from 50 to 86.  However, two other stations shared the broadcast frequency with WEVD: WHAZ, the radio station of Rensselaer Polytechnic Institute in Troy, New York, which was on-air only on Monday evenings, and WBBR, also of New York, New York, owned by the Watchtower Bible and Tract Society, publishing arm of the religious group Jehovah's Witnesses. From the time of the 1932 broadcasting agreement through the 1970s the Socialist and Yiddish-language WEVD continued to share its station frequency with the religious group, transmitting 86 hours per week while leaving Sundays and early mornings until 8 am to WBBR (sold and changed to WPOW in 1957), and Monday nights to WHAZ. WHAZ was sold to the owners of WPOW in 1967 and turned into a non-interfering, daytime-only station, with WPOW taking the old WHAZ Monday night hours. All of these stations moved from 1300 to 1330 kHz with the coming into force of the North American Regional Broadcasting Agreement on March 29, 1941.

It is said that "he who pays the piper calls the tune," and it was clear by 1932 from whence came the funding of "Debs radio." The Jewish Daily Forward's investment in the station soon swelled to nearly $250,000 and its influence over programming increased commensurately. Throughout the 1930s the station's editorial line moved steadily away from explicitly socialist politics to a more centrist orientation, paralleling the political perspective of The Forward itself. The Forward also underwrote the 1938 purchase of WFAB.

Free access to the airwaves by trade unions was increasingly restricted and left wing political broadcasting sometimes faced preemption in favor of sponsored commercial content. The station ultimately emerged as the radio arm of The Forward, while the Socialist Party turned to the airwaves of the National Broadcast Company and other channels in its efforts to make its political message heard on a mass basis.

WEVD did not become completely apolitical in this period, however, as during the 1930s a weekly talk show was launched hosted by Chester M. Wright of the International Labor News Service. This show paid its way through a commercial sponsorship by Avalon Cigarettes and was syndicated to a national audience through electrical transcription.

On January 9, 1950, Harold Cammer, Burton Zorn, Edwin M. Ottenbourg, Samuel Harris Cohen spoke with Stanley G. House as moderator on "Should New York State Have a Little Taft-Hartley Law?"

In 1951, a WEVD-FM was added to the airwaves, first broadcasting at 107.5, then moving to 97.9 a year later, where it remained for the next 36 years.

On February 6, 1953, New York University philosophy professor Sidney Hook discussed "The Threat to Academic Freedom" with Victor Riesel and others in the evening on WEVD radio.

In 1975, WEVD was approved to begin using the transmitting facilities of its shared-time partner, WPOW, on Rossville, Staten Island.

Sale and transformation
By 1978, the Forward was analyzing the sale of the unprofitable AM outlet. In 1981, the Forward Association sold WEVD AM to Salem Media, which changed the station's format and call letters, making it the Christian station WNYM. Salem subsequently purchased WPOW, merging that station into WNYM and eliminating the 52-year time-share on 1330 as of December 31, 1984. WEVD-FM remained on the air under The Forward's ownership at this time. WNYM evolved into the present WWRV, now broadcasting around the clock on 1330 AM.

In 1988, Emmis Broadcasting acquired the license of WNBC and moved WFAN from 1050 to 660 AM. Emmis sold the license for 1050 to Spanish Broadcasting System (SBS), which quickly agreed to trade that license with cash to the Forward Association for WEVD-FM. Until the latter transaction was approved, SBS operated 1050 as a Spanish-language station called WUKQ. When the deal was finally consummated, WEVD moved its call letters and programming to 1050 and the former WEVD-FM became WSKQ-FM. WEVD gradually replaced much of its brokered ethnic programming with liberal talk shows over the next several years; it gained some loyal listeners, but not enough to keep the station economically viable. In 2001, the Forward Association entered into a local marketing agreement with ESPN Radio, and WEVD began broadcasting that network's programming on September 2 of that year. In 2003, the station was sold outright to ESPN and its call letters changed to WEPN, officially ending the 76-year history of WEVD in New York City.

See also
 WCFL, radio station in Chicago operated by the Chicago Federation of Labor.
 WWRV 1330 in New York City, which established the WEVD call sign in 1927, and used it until 1981.
 WSKQ-FM 97.9 in New York City, which held the WEVD-FM call sign from 1952 to 1989.
 WEPN 1050 in New York City, which held the WEVD call sign from 1989 to 2003.

Footnotes

Further reading
 Nathan Godfried, WCFL: Chicago's Voice of Labor, 1926-78. Urbana, IL: University of Illinois Press, 1997.
 David Goodman, Radio's Civic Ambition: American Broadcasting and Democracy in the 1930s. New York: Oxford University Press, 2011.
WEVD Radio Station (New York) Records (RG 1271) are held in the archives of the YIVO Institute for Jewish Research in New York City.

1927 establishments in New York City
Radio stations established in 1927
EVD
Socialist Party of America
Jewish-American history
Jews and Judaism in New York City
Call signs
Jewish socialism
Yiddish-language mass media in the United States
Eugene V. Debs
1981 disestablishments in New York (state) 
Radio stations disestablished in 1981 
Defunct religious radio stations in the United States 
Defunct radio stations in the United States 
Jewish radio stations in the United States 
EVD
Secular Jewish culture in North America